The 1905–06 season was the 14th in the history of the Western Football League.

Queens Park Rangers were the champions of Division One for the first time, after finishing bottom of the league the previous season. Along with all the other members of Division One, they also competed in the Southern League during this season. The Division Two champions for the second season in succession were Bristol Rovers Reserves.

Division One
No new clubs joined Division One, which remained at 11 clubs.

Division Two
Two new clubs joined Division Two, which remained at 10 clubs after Swindon Town Reserves left the league and Warmley disbanded.
Paulton Rovers, rejoining from the Somerset Senior League
Salisbury City, joining from the Hampshire League. This is not the same club as the later incarnation of Salisbury City F.C.

References

1905-06
West